Tankō (Jap.  "short armor") is a form of Japanese armor that was common in the Kofun period.

Tankō 

The tankō is the first uniquely definable type of Japanese armor. Other types that were used earlier such as Jòdai no Katchù (ancient armor, as described by armor historian Suenaga Masao) have been mentioned, but are not entirely verifiable.
The tankō was made of sheet iron and tanned leather, laced at the hips to conform to the wearer's body. The leather served as a support for the iron sheets, and as a protective lining meant to prevent damage to the wearer's clothing and skin. The iron sheets were formed into strips that were riveted side-by-side or overlapping. The carapace was built higher than the breastplate in order to provide protection for the neck. The front side had an opening that could be closed once the armor was put on. The armor was attached to the body via fabric bands that ran over the shoulders.

Keikō 

Another Japanese armor type from the Kofun period, the keikō ("hanging armor"). The type was also used in Japan as armor for mounted forces as the use of cavalry in warfare increased in importance. 
The difference between the tankō and keikō lies in the upper chest area of the armor, which in the keikō variant included a protective sheath of iron bands. The lower portion of both types consisted of overlapping iron lammellae. The use of leather underpinnings was also used by both forms. The bands were fixed together through riveting or the use of leather straps.

Helmet 

The helmets (mabisashi) worn with the tankō armor type are known in two versions. The first type (jap. Kondu Maruhachi) consisted of sheets of overlapping iron similar to the tankō chest piece). Lamella pieces were riveted to horizontally lying bands to create a dome shape for the helmet. A short eye shield was attached to the front, which was often pierced with holes. A small hump with a fixing pin for a crest lied at the top of the helmet's dome. 

The second type was created differently, with horizontal and vertical bands throughout the helm's dome. The eye shield and attachment for the crest were much larger. The attachment also included a shell-like form that served to further fasten and accentuate the crest.

Shield 
The shield worn with this type of armor was made of sheet iron fixed to a wooden base. The shield's components were fixed to each other and the shield's body through the use of riveting. The exterior has a slightly convex shape, and was decorated with triangular and linear patterns.

Naming Origins 
The names tankō and keikō are not historical, but archaeological in origin. In the sacrificial book of Tōdai-ji from 756 tankō and keikō are listed as gifts. These terms were then assigned to varying types of excavated armor.

Literature 
 講談社, Japan. An illustrated encyclopedia. Band 1: A – L. Kodansha, Tokio 1993, .
 William Wayne Farris: Sacred texts and buried treasures. Issues in the historical archaeology of ancient Japan. University of Hawai'i Press, Honolulu HI 1998, .
 Karl Friday: Samurai, warfare and the state in early medieval Japan. Routledge, New York NY u. a. 2004, S. 186, 187.
 Thomas Louis, Tommy Ito: Samurai. The Code of the Warrior. Sterling Publishing Company, New York NY 2008, .

References

External links 

 Reconstruction of a Tankō helm
 Kofun Jidai Tankō from Flickr.
 Kofun Jidai Tankō in the Tokyo National Museum from Flickr
 Kofun helm in Metropolitan Museum, New York

Japanese armour